The 2011–12 season will be Barnsley's fifth consecutive season in the Championship since promotion in 2006.

Season overview

Events
  – Mark Robins resigns as manager after 2 years in charge of Barnsley.
  – Barnsley are granted permission by Rochdale to speak to manager Keith Hill.
  – Keith Hill is appointed as manager on a year contract. David Flitcroft is appointed as assistant manager.

Championship

Standings

Results summary

Result round by round

Squad details

Squad statistics

Appearances and goals
Last Updated 29 April 2012

|-
!colspan="12"|Player who left Barnsley during the season

|}

Top scorers

Disciplinary record

Suspensions served

Transfers

In

Loans in

Out

Loans out

Contracts

Fixtures and results

Pre-season

Championship

FA Cup

League Cup

References

Barnsley
Barnsley F.C. seasons